Phillip L. Isenberg (born February 25, 1939) served in the California State Assembly from 1982 to 1996. He represented the city of Sacramento and surrounding areas.

Political career
Prior to his service in the Assembly, he was mayor of Sacramento from 1975 until 1982. Isenberg was known as a budget expert while serving in the Assembly.
 
During his tenure in the Legislature, Isenberg served as Chair of the Assembly Judiciary Committee (1989–96) and Assistant Speaker pro Tempore (1986–88). He served on the following standing Assembly committees: Health (1982–94), Water, Parks & Wildlife (1982–93), Judiciary (1986–96), Revenue & Taxation (1987–94), Rules (1984–88), Ways and Means (1986–88), Housing & Community Development (1995–96), Elections, Reapportionment & Constitutional Amendments (1988–90), Consumer Protection, Governmental Efficiency & Economic Development (1995–96), Banking & Finance (1995–96), Public Safety (1994) and Utilities & Commerce (1996).

In 1998, Isenberg was one of three individuals selected by Governor-elect Gray Davis to help prepare his 1999-2000 budget. He performed the same function in 2001 and again in 2002. He chaired the transition committee for Treasurer-elect Phil Angelides in 1998 and in 1996 chaired the transition committee for Speaker-elect Cruz Bustamante.

Teaching career
Isenberg currently teaches public policy development and budget and fiscal policy at the McGeorge School of Law, and previously at the Goldman School of Public Policy at UC Berkeley and the Graduate School of Public Policy, California State University, Sacramento.

Board memberships
Isenberg serves as the vice-president of WEAVE (Women Escaping a Violent Environment) which is located in Sacramento. He is a member of the advisory board to California Lawyer magazine and the board of directors of 21st Century Insurance Company and Verge Center For The Arts.

In 2004, Isenberg became the chair of the Marine Life Protection Act Blue Ribbon Task Force, which is conducting a two-year study of how best to protect the oceans off California. Created by the Agency, with funding from the nonprofit Resources Legacy Fund Foundation, this program is part of the Arnold Schwarzenegger Administration's Oceans Initiative.

References

External links
Join California Phillip L. Isenberg

1939 births
Living people
Democratic Party members of the California State Assembly
Mayors of Sacramento, California
Politicians from Gary, Indiana
Lawyers from Sacramento, California
Goldman School of Public Policy faculty
20th-century American politicians